The Big Orange is one of a number of Big Things to be found in Australia, and is located near the Riverland town of Berri in South Australia. Standing at 15 metres in height, with a diameter of 12 metres, it is the biggest of the "big fruit" in Australia, and incorporates a cafe, souvenir shop, function room, lookout and a 360 degree mural within the structure. Opened in 1980, the landmark has at times struggled to find commercial success, changing hands in 2000, 2006 and again in 2008. Nevertheless, it has been described as the "most defining icon of the region".

History 

The Big Orange was conceived by Bronte Coombe, Vern Chubb and David Marshall. The three invested $145,000 into the venture in the mid-1970s, and the Big Orange opened on 14 January 1980. At the time it was claimed to be the "largest sphere in the southern hemisphere", and Bronte Combe is quoted as stating that it was the only big thing at the time that had a business conducted from within it.

In 2002 the Big Orange was sold for between $100,000 and $120,000 to RivSkills, an employment and training agency. They operated the attraction as an Enterprise Learning Centre, but two years later the Big Orange was forced to close, with the owners citing "financial losses and management issues" as contributing factors.

Two years after it closed, in 2006, the Big Orange was purchased by Kevin Dickerson. The Cooltong-based horticulturist planned to expand the property, but a combination of rising fuel prices and the drought saw problems emerge with the business, to the point where the Big Orange was no longer "a viable part of his business plan". The site ended up in the hands of liquidators, and on 29 October 2008 the site was due to go to auction. Options for potential buyers provided by the liquidator include buying the Big Orange, the land, and the water entitlement separately, and it was suggested the buyers might consider rejuvenating the landmark by turning it into a "big golf ball with sponsors' names painted on it". Although the October auction was unsuccessful, with the Big Orange failing to attract any bids, the site was subsequently sold in November to a local businessman. According to the agent who handled the sale, the new owner intends for the Big Orange to remain at the current site, and plans to once again open it to the public.

Design and construction 

The Big Orange was designed by John Twopenny, an Adelaide based architect, and constructed by Hoffmann Engineering. It stands at 15 metres in height, and has a 12-metre diameter, making it the largest of the big things in Australia based upon fruit. It is constructed of fibreglass panels surrounded a steel frame, and weighs in the vicinity of 85 tonnes.

A footbridge is used to access the main structure, within which can be found four levels. The first contains a function room, the second a combination souvenir shop and cafe, while the third level possesses a 360 degree mural depicting the local scenery. The fourth floor has a lookout providing a view of the surrounding orchards.

Footnotes

References 

 
 
 
 
 
 
 
 

Big things in South Australia
Riverland
1980 sculptures
Oranges (fruit)